Isla San Francisco is a small island in Mexico located in the Gulf of California off the eastern coast of Baja California Sur, south of Isla San José.

Biology
Isla San Francisco has 10 species of reptiles, including the endemic Isla San Francisco whiptail (Aspidoscelis franciscensis).

See also

 Geography of Mexico
 Geography of North America

Bibliography

References

External links
 Location map of the island

Islands of Baja California Sur
Islands of the Gulf of California
Uninhabited islands of Mexico